Günther Krappe (13 April 1893 – 31 December 1981) was a German officer in the Second World War. He commanded the 61st Infantry Division.

Promotions 
Leutnant (22 March 1914)
Oberleutnant (20 May 1917)
Hauptmann (1 February 1925)
Major (1 April 1934)
Oberstleutnant (1 August 1936)
Oberst (1 April 1939)
Generalmajor (1 November 1942)
Generalleutnant (1 October 1943)

Career 
Entered Army Service (25 September 1912)
Fahnenjunker in the 34th Fusilier-Regiment (25 September 1912 – 1914)
Platoon & Company Leader (1914–1918)
Transferred into the 4th Reichswehr-Infantry-Regiment (1 October 1919 – 1922)
Adjutant of II. Battalion of the 4th Infantry-Regiment (1922–1 June 1926)
Company-Chief in the 4th Infantry-Regiment (1 June 1926 – 1 October 1930)
Chief Intelligence Officer (Ic) in the Staff of the 2nd Division (1 October
1930–1 October 1935)
Commander of II. Battalion of the 59th Infantry-Regiment (1 October 1935–1 October
1937)
Commander of III. Battalion of the 73rd Infantry-Regiment (1 October 1937–1 July
1939)
Commander of the 1st Supplemental-Regiment, Danzig (1 July 1939 – 1 October 1939)
Military-Attaché in Budapest (1 October 1939 – 30 April 1941)
Military-Attaché in Madrid (1 October 1941 – 1 December 1942)
Führer-Reserve OKH (1 December 1942 – 18 January 1943)
Division-Leader-Course, Panzer Troop School Wünsdorf (18 January 1943 – 12 February 1943)
Delegated with the Leadership of the 61st Infantry Division (12 February 1943 – 1 May 1943)
Commander of the 61st Infantry-Division (1 May 1943 – 11 December 1944)
Führer-Reserve OKH (15 December 1944 – 10 February 1945)
Course for Commanding Generals (4 November 1944 – 31 January 1945)
Delegated with the Leadership of X. Waffen SS-Corps der SS (10 February 1945 – 6 March 1945)
In Soviet captivity (6 March 1945 – 1 March 1949)
Released (1 March 1949)

Awards and decorations
 1914 Iron Cross, 1st and 2nd class
 War Merit Cross, 2nd Class (Brunswick)
 Honour Cross of the World War 1914/1918
 Wehrmacht Long Service Award, 4th to 1st class
 1939 Clasp to the Iron Cross, 1st and 2nd class
 Knight's Cross of the Iron Cross on 11 April 1944 Generalleutnant and commander of the 61st Infantry Division.

References

Citations

Bibliography

External links 
 Günther Krappe at feldgrau.com
 :pl:Łobez#Historia Günther Krappe - Er kämpfte in der Nähe Łobez

1893 births
1981 deaths
People from the Province of Pomerania
Lieutenant generals of the German Army (Wehrmacht)
Recipients of the Knight's Cross of the Iron Cross
Recipients of the clasp to the Iron Cross, 1st class
Prussian Army personnel
Reichswehr personnel
German Army personnel of World War I
German Army generals of World War II